Utah County Academy of Sciences (UCAS)  is a small charter high school in association with Utah Valley University (UVU) in Orem, Utah, United States. UCAS students travel from school districts in the surrounding Utah County area including Nebo School District, Alpine School District, and Provo School District.

This school has two locations. The Provo campus is for ninth and tenth grade students. It is located at 2121 N 550 W, Provo, UT, 84604. The Orem campus is for eleventh and twelfth grade students. It is located on the Northern end of the UVU campus at 940 W 800 S, Orem, UT, 84058. Classes are scheduled to meet both the college and high school graduation requirements.

UCAS was created along with six similar schools by former governor of Utah Michael Leavitt. 
 
The school has a driver's education, a student government, yearbook staff, technology student association, writing club, and several other student organized clubs. The school participates in the multicultural association programs in addition to all associations affiliated with UVU.

Most UCAS students graduate with an associate degree along with their high school diploma.

UCAS academics 
UCAS was ranked first out of all high schools in Utah by the Sutherland Institute.

Achievements
2005
Took first in academics with a 77 on the Iowa Test of Basic Skills (ITBS) (1/135) for 2005 (with a district average of 64 and state average of 59).
2006
Took first in environment (1/135).
Took second in college prep (2/37).
Received a 26 on the Iowa Test of Basic Skills (up from 12 in 2005).
 Eighty percent of UCAS graduates earned their associate degrees from UVSC when they graduated.  The first graduating class was 20 students.
2007
Took first in the stock market game during the fall semester.
2008
Took fifth in the Utah Science Olympiad.
Took second in the stock market game during spring semester.
2009
Took second in the Utah Science Olympiad.
Won the Utah Charter School of the Year Award.
Took fifth in the stock market game during fall semester.
2010
Took second in the Utah Science Olympiad.
2011
Took second in the Utah Science Olympiad.
Took second in the Utah Stock Market Game during spring semester.
Scored first in science using state end of level exams.
Tied for first in literacy using the state end of level exams.
2012
Took first in the Utah Science Olympiad.
Participated in the Utah State Math Contest.
2013
Was ranked the best school in the state of Utah.

References

External links 
UCAS homepage
UVU homepage

Public high schools in Utah
Charter schools in Utah
Educational institutions established in 2005
Schools in Utah County, Utah
2005 establishments in Utah